Phebalium woombye, commonly known as wallum phebalium, is a species of shrub that is endemic to eastern Australia. It has branchlets covered with scales and star-shaped hairs, elliptical leaves, and white to pink flowers arranged in umbels of four to ten flowers.

Description
The upper surface of the leaves is flat and glabrous, the lower surface with a prominent mid-vein and covered with silvery scales. Flowering occurs from July to August.

Taxonomy and naming
This species was first formally described in 1898 by Frederick Manson Bailey who gave it the name Asterolasia woombye and published the description in the Queensland Agricultural Journal from specimens collected near Woombye. In 1913 Karel Domin changed the name to Phebalium woombye, publishing the change in the journal Repertorium Specierum Novarum Regni Vegetabilis.

Distribution and habitat
Phebalium woombye mainly grows in coastal sand dunes, sometimes further inland and is found from south-east Queensland to as far south as Glenreagh in New South Wales.

References

woombye
Flora of New South Wales
Flora of Queensland
Plants described in 1898
Taxa named by Frederick Manson Bailey